The 1974 ABN World Tennis Tournament was a men's tennis tournament played on indoor carpet courts at Rotterdam Ahoy in the  Netherlands. It was part of the 1974 World Championship Tennis circuit. The tournament was held from 25 March through 31 March 1974. Second-seeded Tom Okker won the singles title.

Finals

Singles

 Tom Okker defeated  Tom Gorman 4–6, 7–6(7–2), 6–1

Doubles
 Bob Hewitt /  Frew McMillan defeated  Pierre Barthes /  Ilie Năstase 3–6, 6–4, 6–3

References

External links
 Official website 
 Official website 
 ATP tournament profile
 ITF tournament edition details

 
ABN World Tennis Tournament
1974 in Dutch tennis